Oregon Children's Theatre (OCT) is a children's theatre organization based in Portland, Oregon. Originally created by Sondra Pearlman as the "Theatre for Young People" in 1988, OCT became a resident company of the Portland Center for the Performing Arts in 1991.

As part of the COVID-19 pandemic, the theatre received between $150,000 and $350,000 in federally backed small business loan from US Bank as part of the Paycheck Protection Program. The company stated it would allow them to retain 91 jobs.

References

External links

 
 Oregon Children's Theatre at Portland'5 Centers for the Arts

1988 establishments in Oregon
Arts organizations established in 1988
Children's theatre
Organizations based in Portland, Oregon
Theatre companies in Oregon